Smith's Landing, Smiths Landing, or Smith Landing may refer to:

Antioch, California, formerly Smith's Landing, a city in the United States
Fitzgerald, Alberta, originally Smith's Landing, an unincorporated community in Canada, upstream from Fort Smith
Ross River, Yukon, originally Smiths Landing, an unincorporated community in Canada
Smith Landing, Denton, Maryland, a neighborhood in Denton, Maryland, United States
Smith's Landing First Nation, a band government in Canada
Smith's Landing, Georgia, an unincorporated community in Decatur County, Georgia, United States
Smiths Landing, New Jersey, a community in Pleasantville, New Jersey, United States
Smith's Landing, New York, a hamlet in Catskill, New York, United States
Smiths Landing, New York, a community in Lowville, New York, United States